Benjamin Whitehead (born 15 May 1977) is an English actor. He is best known as the current voice of Wallace in the Wallace and Gromit franchise following Peter Sallis' retirement and subsequent death.

Career
Whitehead began working on films with Aardman Animations in 2005. That same year, he took over the voice role of Wallace from Peter Sallis becoming the official voice for Wallace in Wallace & Gromit's Grand Adventures, the four-part episodic adventure game by Telltale Games.

After Sallis retired from the role in 2010, Whitehead later performed as Wallace in Wallace & Gromit's Musical Marvels, Prom 20 of the 2012 season of the BBC Proms. Outside of acting, Whitehead is also Aardman's read-in artist.

Filmography

Film

Television

Video games

Web

Theatre
 2012 Wallace & Gromit's Musical Marvels, Wallace (voice)

References

External links
 
 

1975 births
21st-century English male actors
English male actors
English male stage actors
English male voice actors
English entertainers
Living people